Rowing Canada Aviron (RCA), formally the Canadian Amateur Rowing Association, is a non-profit organization recognized by the Government of Canada and the Canadian Olympic Committee as the national governing body for the sport of rowing in Canada. RCA represents 15,000 registered members at all levels, including novices, juniors, university students, adaptive, seniors and masters, whether they row for recreation, health and fitness or competition. This includes clubs such as the St. Catharines rowing club, and the Victoria City Rowing Club.

RCA was founded as The Canadian Association of Amateur Oarsmen in 1880 by the rowing clubs then in existence to coordinate and regulate the sport of amateur rowing. In 1974, its name was changed to the Canadian Amateur Rowing Association.

RCA is a member of the Canadian Olympic Committee and the International Rowing Federation (FISA), the international federation for rowing.

See also 
 CSSRA rowing — Governing organization for high school rowing in Canada
 Leander Boat Club (Canada)

External links 
 
 Canadian Rowing Events and Results

Canada
Rowing in Canada
Sports governing bodies in Canada
1880 establishments in Canada